20 Cigarettes is a 2010 Italian drama film directed by Aureliano Amadei. Amadei was a survivor of the 2003 Nasiriyah bombing and recalls his experience in the film.

Cast
 Vinicio Marchioni as Aureliano Amadei
 Carolina Crescentini as Claudia
 Giorgio Colangeli as Stefano Rolla
  as Generale Stano

References

External links 

2010 films
2010 drama films
Italian drama films
2010s Italian-language films
2010s Italian films